The Science of Orgasm is a 2006 book by Beverly Whipple, Barry R. Komisaruk and Carlos Beyer-Flores in which the authors explore research findings about orgasm and other aspects of human sexuality.

References

External links 
 

2006 non-fiction books
English-language books
Johns Hopkins University Press books
Non-fiction books about sexuality
Books about orgasm